Cliffe Common railway station, also known as Cliff Common, formerly Cliff Common Gate, served the village of Cliffe, Selby, England from 1848 to 1964 on the Selby-Driffield line, and was the southern terminus of the Derwent Valley Light Railway.

History
The station opened on 1 August 1848 by the York and North Midland Railway. The station was situated on the east side of Lowmoor Road. The station was originally known as Cliff Common Gate, although the 'Gate' was dropped in October 1864. A second platform was built in 1889 when the line was doubled. The goods yard consisted of three sidings, one serving a cattle dock behind the up platform, a further siding on the opposite side of the line behind the down platform and a private siding called Malt Kiln siding. The main freight handled at the station was 1187 tons of potatoes, 665 tons of hay/clover and 399 tons of vegetables. The station closed to passengers on 20 September 1954 although it was still used for excursions until 1957. 

The station closed to goods traffic on 28 January 1964.
It was the junction station for the Derwent Valley Light Railway which opened for goods traffic in 1912 and passenger traffic in 1913. Passenger services were withdrawn on 1 September 1923 but goods traffic continued until November 1961. Subsequently the line was abandoned and the track was removed.

References

External links

Former York and North Midland Railway stations
Railway stations in Great Britain opened in 1848
Railway stations in Great Britain closed in 1954
1848 establishments in England
1964 disestablishments in England